WAYO-LP is a radio station based in Rochester, New York, broadcasting at 104.3 MHz on the FM band.

Online broadcasting began on November 30, 2015. The launch of FM radio broadcasting began on January 4, 2016.

External links

AYO-LP
Radio stations established in 2016
2016 establishments in New York (state)
AYO-LP